Justine Henin was the defending champion, but retired from the sport on May 14, 2008.

Elena Dementieva won the all-Russian final, 6–3, 2–6, 6–1, over Dinara Safina.

World No. 2 and the first seed Serena Williams was nearly out of the tournament two times. Williams saved four match points in her first round clash against Samantha Stosur & three more against Caroline Wozniacki in the quarterfinals. Williams was defeated by the eventual champion Dementieva in the semifinals in straight sets.

Seeds

Draw

Finals

Top half

Bottom half

External links
Draw

Medibank International Sydney - Women's Singles
Wom